Michael Gardner may refer to:

Michael Gardner, American politician
Mike Gardner, American football coach
Michael Gardner, guitarist with rock trio PKM, see No Direction Home
Michael Gardner, co-founder of Peachpit Press 1986 and co-author of the company's first book, LaserJet Unlimited

See also
Mick Gardner
Michael Gardiner (disambiguation)